Taylor's Mill is a historic grist mill located near Middlesex, Nash County, North Carolina.  The mill was built about 1850, and is a two-story, gable roofed frame building on a stone pier foundation. The mill measures approximately 30 feet wide by 40 feet long.

It was listed on the National Register of Historic Places in 1980.

References

Grinding mills in North Carolina
Grinding mills on the National Register of Historic Places in North Carolina
Industrial buildings completed in 1850
Buildings and structures in Nash County, North Carolina
National Register of Historic Places in Nash County, North Carolina